The McDonnell Douglas MD-11 is an American tri-jet wide-body airliner manufactured by American McDonnell Douglas (MDC) and later by Boeing.

Following DC-10 development studies, the MD-11 program was launched on December 30, 1986.
Assembly of the first prototype began on March 9, 1988. Its maiden flight occurred on January 10, and it achieved FAA certification on November 8, 1990. The first delivery was to Finnair on December 7 and it entered service on December 20, 1990.

It retains the basic trijet configuration of the DC-10 with updated GE CF6-80C2 or PW4000 turbofan engines. It features a glass cockpit that eliminates the need for a flight engineer.

The MD-11 failed to meet its range and fuel burn targets. The last of 200 aircraft was built in October 2000 after Boeing merged with McDonnell Douglas in 1997. 
Some MD-11 freighters were built, but many more are converted MD-11 passenger aircraft, many of which are still in service with cargo airlines.

Development

Origins
Although the MD-11 program was launched in 1986, McDonnell Douglas had started to search for a DC-10 derivative as early as 1976. At the same time, the manufacturer was seeking to reduce wing and engine drag on the trijet. Another version of the aircraft was also envisaged, the "DC-10 global", aimed to counter the risks of loss of orders for the DC-10-30 that the Boeing 747SP and its range were causing. The DC-10 global would have incorporated more fuel tanks.

While continuing their research for a new aircraft, McDonnell Douglas designated the program DC-10 Super 60, previously known for a short time as DC-10 Super 50.

Following more refinements, in 1979 the DC-10 Super 60 was proposed in three distinct versions like the DC-8. The DC-10-61 was designed to be a high-capacity medium-range aircraft. Like the DC-8, the series 62 was proposed for long-range routes. It would be capable of carrying up to 350 passengers (mixed class) or 440 passengers (all-economy), similar to the later Boeing 777-200 or the Airbus A330-300/A340-300/500. Finally, the series 63 would have incorporated the same fuselage as the DC-10-61 as well as the larger wing of the -62. After high-profile accidents in the 1970s, such as Turkish Airlines Flight 981 and American Airlines Flight 191, the trijet's reputation was seriously damaged by doubts regarding its structural integrity. For these reasons, and due to a downturn in the airline industry, all work on the Super 60 was stopped.

In 1981, a Continental Airlines DC-10-10 (registration number N68048) was leased to conduct more research, particularly the effects the newly designed winglets would have on aircraft performance. Different types of winglets were tested during that time in conjunction with NASA. McDonnell Douglas was again planning new DC-10 versions that could incorporate winglets and more efficient engines developed at the time by Pratt & Whitney (PW2037) and Rolls-Royce (RB.211-535F4). The manufacturer finally rationalized all these studies under the MD-EEE (Ecology-Economy-Efficiency) designation, that was later modified to the MD-100 following some more changes. Both versions could be powered by the same engine families as the actual MD-11 plus the RB.211-600. However, the situation for the manufacturer, and the airline industry in general, did not look bright. No new DC-10 orders were received, and many among the observers and customers doubted that the manufacturer would stay in business much longer. Thus, the Board of Directors decided in November 1983 to once again cease all work on the projected new trijet.

The following year no new orders for the DC-10 were received. The production line was kept active thanks to earlier orders from the U.S. Air Force for 60 KC-10A tankers. McDonnell Douglas was still convinced that a new derivative for the DC-10 was needed, as shown by the second-hand market for their Series 30 and the heavier DC-10-30ER version. Thus, in 1984 a new derivative aircraft version of the DC-10 was designated MD-11. From the very beginning, the MD-11X was conceived in two different versions.

As more orders for the DC-10 were received, McDonnell Douglas used the time gained before the end of DC-10 production to consult with potential customers and to refine the proposed new trijet. In July 1985, the Board of Directors authorized the Long Beach plant to offer the MD-11 to potential customers. A year later, as several airlines had committed to the MD-11, the situation was looking optimistic. Further growth of the aircraft was also foreseen, such as the MD-11 Advanced.

The lack of innovation from McDonnell Douglas during the MD-11's design had been attributed to the company's declining cash flow, as it struggled with problems with its military contracts and declining orders for its commercial jets. Limited company resources resulting in the MD-11 being developed as a refinement of the existing DC-10, in contrast to rivals Airbus and Boeing who during this time period developed all-new aircraft designs that would become the Airbus A330/A340 and Boeing 777. As a trijet the MD-11 was less fuel-efficient but had a greater range than its mid-size widebody contemporaries which were twinjets (the existing Boeing 767 and upcoming Airbus A330). Aerospace consultant Scott Hamilton, in a 2014 article, said that the MD-11 was "classically ill-timed" as "it came at the end of the three- or four-engine era, just ahead of the real move to ETOPS with the 777". McDonnell Douglas's initiative to "outsource everything but design, final assembly, and flight testing and sales of the MD-11" was also seen as contributing to the end of their commercial airline business.

Launch and costs
On December 30, 1986, McDonnell Douglas launched the MD-11 with commitments for 52 firm orders and 40 options in three different versions (passenger, combi and freighter) from ten airlines (Alitalia, British Caledonian, Dragonair, Federal Express, Finnair, Korean Air, Scandinavian Airlines, Swissair, Thai Airways International, and VARIG) and two leasing companies (Guinness Peat Aviation and Mitsui). Orders from Dragonair, Scandinavian and UTA, an undisclosed customer, were canceled by 1988.

In 1987, the program was to cost $1.5 billion with $500 million for development and almost $1 billion for tooling and inventory. The first 52 firm orders totalled $5 billion, or $95 million each, while the A340 sold for $67 million. At certification in 1990, $2.5 billion were invested in initial production inventory, and $700 million for engineering, tools and flight testing. While it was selling for $100 million, the initial MD-11 jets cost $120 to $150 million to produce but this was to reduce to $90 million with manufacturing experience over the program life for an 11% gross profit margin, less than the 15% to 20% Boeing obtains.

In 1992, the $1.7 billion development cost was to be spread over the first 301 aircraft produced for $100 million each. In 1995, because costs and revenues could not be reasonably estimated over the program life, MDC took a pre-tax charge of $1.838 billion for deferred production costs and for reduced support and tooling value. In 1999, unit cost was $132-$147.5 million (equivalent to $-$ million in  dollars).

Production and performance issues

Assembly of the first MD-11 began on March 9, 1988, and the mating of the fuselage with wings occurred in October that year. The first flight was originally planned to occur in March 1989, but numerous problems with the manufacturing, delays with suppliers producing essential components and labor industrial actions delayed the ceremonial roll out of the prototype until September of that year. The following months were used to prepare the prototype for its maiden flight, which finally happened on January 10, 1990. The first two aircraft manufactured were intended for FedEx and thus, were already fitted with the forward side cargo door. They remained with the manufacturer as test aircraft until 1991 before being completely converted to freighters and delivered to their customer. FAA certification was achieved on November 8, 1990 while the European Joint Aviation Authorities (JAA) certified the MD-11 on October 17, 1991 after approximately 200 separate issues were resolved.  Fuselage sections for the DC-10, KC-10, and MD-11 were built by General Dynamics' Convair Division. Yugoslav Airlines, already flying several DC-10s, became the first customer of the MD-11. Three aircraft were manufactured but were never delivered due to the Yugoslav Wars. The first MD-11 was delivered to Finnair on December 7, 1990 and it accomplished the first revenue service by an MD-11 on December 20, 1990, carrying passengers from Helsinki to Tenerife in the Canary Islands. MD-11 service in the U.S. was inaugurated by Delta Air Lines the following year.

It was during this period that flaws in the MD-11's performance became apparent. It failed to meet its targets for range and fuel burn. American Airlines in particular was unimpressed with the 19 MD-11s that it received, as was Singapore Airlines who canceled their order for 20 MD-11s and instead ordered 20 Airbus A340-300s. American Airlines cited problems with the performance of the engines and airframe, while Singapore Airlines stated that the MD-11 could not operate on the airline's long haul routes.

In 1990, McDonnell Douglas, along with Pratt & Whitney and General Electric began a modification program known as the Performance Improvement Program (PIP) to improve the aircraft's weight, fuel capacity, engine performance and aerodynamics. McDonnell Douglas worked with NASA's Langley Research Center to study aerodynamic improvements. The PIP lasted until 1995 and recovered the range for the aircraft. However, by this point sales of the MD-11 had already been significantly impacted. In 1995, American Airlines sold their 19 MD-11s to FedEx, as the PIP program was not sufficient for the aircraft to fly the DFW-Hong Kong route.

After McDonnell Douglas merged with Boeing in 1997, the unified company decided that MD-11 production would continue exclusively with the freighter variant. In 1998, Boeing announced it would end MD-11 production after filling orders on hand. The last passenger MD-11 built was delivered to Sabena in April 1998. Assembly of the last two MD-11s were completed in August and October 2000; they were delivered to Lufthansa Cargo on February 22 and January 25, 2001 respectively. Production ended because of lack of sales, resulting from internal competition from the Boeing 767-400 and Boeing 777, as well as external competition from the Airbus A330/A340.

McDonnell Douglas performed studies on the feasibility of removing the tail engine to make a twin-engine jet, but nothing came of it. McDonnell Douglas originally projected that it would sell more than 300 MD-11 aircraft, but only 200 were built. The MD-11 was assembled at McDonnell Douglas's Douglas Products Division in Long Beach, California (later Boeing's facility).

Design

The MD-11 is a medium- to long-range widebody airliner, with two engines mounted on underwing pylons and a third engine at the base of the vertical stabilizer. It is based on the DC-10, but features a stretched fuselage, increased wingspan with winglets, refined airfoils on the wing and tailplane, new engines and increased use of composites. The winglets are credited with improving fuel efficiency by about 2.5%. The MD-11 has a smaller empennage than the DC-10 it is based upon.

The MD-11 features a two-crew cockpit that incorporates six interchangeable CRT-units and advanced Honeywell VIA 2000 computers. The cockpit design is called Advanced Common Flightdeck (ACF) and is shared with the Boeing 717. Flight deck features include an Electronic Instrument System, a dual Flight Management System, a Central Fault Display System, and Global Positioning System. Category IIIb automatic landing capability for bad-weather operations and Future Air Navigation Systems are available.

The MD-11 was one of the first commercial designs to employ a computer-assisted pitch stability augmentation system that featured a fuel ballast tank in the tailplane, and a partly computer-driven horizontal stabilizer. Updates to the software package made the airplane's handling characteristics in manual flight similar to those of the DC-10, despite a smaller tailplane to reduce drag and increase fuel efficiency.

The MD-11 incorporates hydraulic fuses not included in the initial DC-10 design, to prevent catastrophic loss of control in event of hydraulic failure.

Variants

The MD-11 was manufactured in five variants.
MD-11 (131 built): the Passenger variant, was produced from 1988 to 1998. It was the first version on offer at the aircraft's launch in 1986, and was delivered to American Airlines (19), Delta Air Lines (17), Swissair (16), Japan Airlines (10), KLM (10), and other airlines with fewer aircraft.
The main deck cargo compartment was accessible by a large rear port-side cargo door, which measured . Additional freight was also carried in below-deck compartments. The MD-11C could also be configured as an all-passenger aircraft. All five aircraft were manufactured between 1991 and 1992 and delivered to Alitalia, the only customer for that variant. In 2005 and 2006 the airline converted them to full-freighter configurations to be operated by Alitalia's cargo division. Following that division's closure, the five aircraft were returned to their lessor in January 2009.

 MD-11CF (six built): the Convertible Freighter variant was launched in 1991 by an order from Martinair for three aircraft plus two options. The MD-11CF feature a large forward port-side cargo door located between the first  doors, and can be used in an all-passenger or in an all-cargo configuration. All six MD-11CFs were delivered to Martinair (four) and World Airways (two) during 1995. The two World Airways aircraft were converted to freight-only in 2002.
 MD-11ER (five built): the Extended Range version was launched by the manufacturer at the Singapore Air Show in February 1994. MD-11ERs were delivered between 1995 and 1997 to Garuda Indonesia (three) and World Airways (two). As of February 2007, only one Finnair MD-11ER has been converted to MD-11 with the removal of the extra fuel tank.

MD-11F (53 built): the Freight transport aircraft was the second variant on offer at launch in 1986 and was the last and longest (1988–2000) manufactured version. The MD-11F was delivered between 1991 and 2001 to FedEx Express (22), Lufthansa Cargo (14), and other airlines with fewer aircraft.
MD-11 Boeing Converted Freighter (BCF) – Boeing and its group of international affiliates offer a conversion of used passenger airliners into freighters. The MD-11BCF is one of the models offered.

Note: Some or all the features of the MD-11ER, including the higher MTOW of 630,500 lb (286,000 kg), part or all of the PIPs aerodynamic improvements packages and composite panels were fitted to later-built MD-11s (except the extra fuel tank), and could be retrofitted to any of the variants, except for the PIP Phase IIIB larger aft-engine intake. Some airlines, such as Finnair, Martinair and FedEx have made the structural changes required to allow their aircraft to have the higher MTOW. Swissair's 16 newly delivered aircraft were retrofitted with all the features except for the extra fuel tank and were so-designated MD-11AH for Advanced Heavy.

Proposed tanker version
After McDonnell Douglas did the KDC-10 conversion for the Royal Netherlands Air Force in 1992, they proposed a tanker/transport version of the MD-11CF which had the in-house designation KMD-11. McDD offered either conversion of second hand aircraft (KMD-11) or new build aircraft (KC-10B), the proposed KMD-11 offered 35,000 lbs more cargo capacity and 8,400 lbs more transferable fuel than the KC-10A. It was offered to the RNAF and RSAF in the 1990s and the RAAF in the early 2000s.

Undeveloped variants

After ending the MD-12 program, McDonnell Douglas focused on 300–400-seat MD-11 derivatives. At the 1996 Farnborough International Air Show, the company presented plans for a new trijet with high seating and long range named "MD-XX". It was offered in the MD-XX Stretch and MD-XX LR versions. The MD-XX Stretch version was to have a longer fuselage than the MD-11 and seat 375 in a typical three-class arrangement. The MD-XX LR was to have a longer range and be the same length as the MD-11; it was to have typical three-class seating for 309. However, the MDC board of directors decided to end the MD-XX program in October 1996, because the financial investment was too large for the company.

Operators

As of August 2022, there are 116 MD-11s in commercial service with cargo operators FedEx Express (57), UPS Airlines (42) and Western Global Airlines (17).

Most of the airlines who ordered the MD-11 for their long-haul passenger flights had replaced it with Airbus A330, A340, and Boeing 777 aircraft by the end of 2004. Some carriers converted their MD-11s to freighters such as China Eastern Airlines and Korean Air. Korean Air announced as early as December 1994 its intention to convert its  MD-11s to freighters for medium-range cargo routes. In 1995, American Airlines agreed to sell its 19 aircraft to FedEx, with the first MD-11 being transferred in 1996. Japan Airlines (JAL) announced the replacement of its 10 MD-11s in 2000; these aircraft were being converted into freighters and sold to UPS in 2004.

In February 2007, TAM Linhas Aéreas began operating the first of three leased passenger MD-11s, in a deal arranged by Boeing as an interim solution for TAM to quickly be able to operate newly granted intercontinental routes while waiting for four Boeing 777-300ERs to be delivered from late 2008. The last MD-11 was retired from TAM's fleet in July 2009, which ended its use by Brazilian airlines (Varig, VASP, and TAM).

In May 2007, Finnair announced the sale of their last two MD-11s to Aeroflot-Cargo to become part of the Russian airline cargo fleet in 2008 and 2009. KLM was the last airline to operate scheduled passenger flights with the passenger version of the MD-11. The final scheduled flight took place on October 26, 2014 from Montréal to Amsterdam, followed by three special roundtrip flights on November 11, 2014.

Two MD-11s were also operated in a VIP configuration, one by Saudia Royal Flight for members of the Royal family, and one by Mid East Jet for ASACO Aviation; both are now stored.

Lufthansa Cargo retired their last MD-11 on October 17, 2021.

Accidents and incidents
As of June 2017, the MD-11 has been involved in 30 aviation incidents, including nine hull-loss accidents with  fatalities.

Notable accidents and incidents
On April 6, 1993, China Eastern Airlines Flight 583, an MD-11 went into severe oscillations when a crew member accidentally deployed the slats during cruise flight over the Pacific Ocean near the Aleutian Islands. Two passengers were seriously injured and later died.
On July 31, 1997, FedEx Express Flight 14, MD-11 N611FE, crashed during a landing at Newark Liberty International Airport, New Jersey. The aircraft flipped onto its back and subsequently burned, following a landing attempt from an unstabilized flare. The five occupants survived with injuries.
On September 2, 1998, Swissair Flight 111, MD-11 HB-IWF, crashed into the Atlantic Ocean near Halifax, Nova Scotia while en route from New York City to Geneva, Switzerland. All 229 people on board perished. The cause of the crash was determined to have been a fire caused by improper wiring of passenger entertainment system units added by Swissair. The fire started at the front of the aircraft and quickly grew uncontrollable, attributed partly to the poor flame retardant properties of its metalized mylar insulation.
On April 15, 1999, Korean Air Cargo Flight 6316, MD-11 registration number HL7373, crashed shortly after takeoff while operating cargo flight KE6316 from Shanghai Hongqiao International Airport to Seoul. Due to confusion on the flight deck, the captain thought the aircraft was too high and needed to descend. The captain pushed the control column abruptly forward, causing the MD-11 to enter a rapid descent from which it could not be recovered. All three occupants on board and five people on the ground were killed.
On August 22, 1999, China Airlines Flight 642, an MD-11 operated by subsidiary Mandarin Airlines, crashed while landing at Hong Kong airport during typhoon Sam that exceeded its crosswind specifications, also flipping onto its back and burning. Three passengers were killed.
On October 17, 1999, FedEx Express Flight 87, MD-11 N581FE, was written off after landing at Subic Bay International Airport, Philippines. The aircraft was operating from Shanghai Hongqiao International Airport. Upon landing, the aircraft rolled down the whole length of the runway before plunging into the bay where it was completely submerged except for the cockpit. An excessive approach and landing speed was pointed out as probable cause of the accident.
On March 23, 2009, FedEx Express Flight 80, MD-11F N526FE, crashed at Narita International Airport, Japan while landing in windy conditions. Airport surveillance video showed the aircraft becoming airborne again after the first touchdown, then impacting nose-first the second time and turning onto its left side, erupting into flames; the impact flipped the aircraft upside-down. The aircraft finally came to rest some distance left of the runway. The two flight crew members were killed.
On November 28, 2009, Avient Aviation Flight 324, MD-11F Z-BAV (c/n 48408), crashed on takeoff from Shanghai Pudong International Airport on a flight to Bishkek-Manas International Airport, Kyrgyzstan with the loss of three lives. The aircraft was written off.
On July 27, 2010, Lufthansa Cargo Flight 8460, a MD-11F, crash-landed in Riyadh, Saudi Arabia. The captain and first officer evacuated the aircraft with injuries. This incident is very similar to FedEx Flight 80 and FedEx Flight 14.
On February 13, 2016, Western Global Airlines Flight 4425 was involved in a stowaway incident that was discovered when the plane had stopped in Harare Airport, Zimbabwe for a fuel stop en-route to King Shaka International Airport, South Africa from Munich, Germany. The deceased stowaway was located in the plane’s cargo hold after ground staff at Harare noticed blood dripping from one of the MD-11’s cargo doors. The crew initially stated that they believed the blood to have come from a bird strike which had been noticed by ground staff at Munich Airport earlier in the plane's journey, but a body of a man who had stowed away on the flight was discovered shortly after the plane and its crew were seized by Zimbabwean authorities.
On June 6, 2016, UPS Airlines Flight 61, MD-11F N277UP suffered a runway excursion and nose gear collapse in a takeoff accident at Seoul-Incheon International Airport (ICN). Takeoff from runway 33L was aborted and the aircraft continued past the end of the runway. The nose gear collapsed and the nos. 1 and 3 engines contacted the grass. The flight was bound for Ted Stevens Anchorage International Airport. All 4 crew members survived without injury. The aircraft was written off.

Safety problems
The MD-11 had problems with its flight control systems that have resulted in multiple accidents and incidents since the aircraft's introduction. The initial design of the slat/flap lever in the cockpit left it prone to being accidentally dislodged by crew in flight. The defect has been corrected since 1992. In the early 2000s, Boeing improved the flight control software at the urging of the FAA to reduce the possibility of violent unintentional pitch movements.

In an effort to improve fuel efficiency, McDonnell Douglas designed the MD-11's center of gravity to be much farther aft than that of other commercial aircraft. There was also a fuel-ballast tank in the MD-11's horizontal stabilizer since its tailplane was smaller than the DC-10's to improve fuel efficiency, but this was found to inhibit the MD-11's crosswind performance. These design features, coupled with standard landing speeds  faster than those of comparable aircraft, significantly reduce the MD-11's margin for error during the takeoff and landing phases, making it more difficult to handle than the smaller DC-10. A number of operators have introduced special training to assist crews in safely handling the MD-11's critical phases of flight.

Specifications

Deliveries

See also

Notes

References

Citations

Bibliography

Steffen, Arthur. McDonnell Douglas MD-11: A Long Beach Swansong. Hinckley, UK: Midland, 2002. .

External links

 MD-11 Historical Snapshot
 

 
MD-11
MD-011
1990s United States airliners
Trijets
Aircraft first flown in 1990